Xanthydrol is an organic chemical compound. Its formula is C13H10O2. Its total molecular weight is 198.221 g/mol. Xanthydrol is used to test the levels of urea in the bloodstream.

Synthesis
Xanthydrol can be produced by the reduction of xanthone.

See also
Xanthene
Xanthone

References

Secondary alcohols
Xanthenes